Wahab Adams (born 25 November 1993) is a Ghanaian professional footballer who plays as defender for Ghana Premier League side Asante Kotoko S.C. He previously played for Aduana Stars.

Club career

Sekondi Hasaacas 
Adams featured for Sekondi Hasaacas before securing a move to play for Aduana Stars.

Aduana Stars 
Adams played for Aduana Stars for 8 years from 2009 to 2017. He was a member of the first title winning campaign in 2009–2010 season. He featured in 29 matches out of 30 to help to second place in the 2016 Ghanaian Premier League season. During the 2017 Ghanaian Premier League, he continued to play a key role in the team, playing a 23 league matches to help them clinch the league title for the second time in the club's history. He won the league twice whilst playing for the club.

Asante Kotoko 
After spending 8 years with Aduana Stars, he showed interest in joining Kumasi Asante Kotoko after his contract with Aduana Stars run out in 2017. He signed a two-year deal with the club in December 2017 ahead of the 2018 Ghanaian Premier League season. He made his debut on 17 March 2018 in a 1–1 draw against West African Football Academy (WAFA). He featured in 13 league matches that season before the league was brought to an abrupt end due to dissolution of the GFA in June 2018, as a result of the Anas Number 12 Expose. In December 2019, he signed a new 2-year contract with the club set to expire in December 2021. In March 2021, there were reports that he had handed in a transfer request to exit the club due to limited play time due to the presence of defensive pair Ismail Abdul Ganiu and Yussif Mubarik who were being played by coach Johnson Smith. His agent later came out to deny the reports. On 17 September 2021, he was released by the club with 3 months left on his contract.

Personal life 
In May 2020, Adams mentioned in an interview with Light FM that, in 3 years of joining Asante Kotoko, he used his salaries to build a house and set up businesses which was bringing him relevant income.

Honours

Club 
Aduana Stars

 Ghana Premier League: 2009–2010, 2017
 Ghana Super Cup: 2018

Asante Kotoko

 GFA Normalization Committee Special Competition: 2019

References

External links 
 
 
 

1993 births
Living people
Association football defenders
Ghanaian footballers
Sekondi Hasaacas F.C. players
Aduana Stars F.C. players
Asante Kotoko S.C. players